Ocean Girl (Ocean Odyssey in the UK) is an Australian science fiction television series aimed for family audiences and starring Marzena Godecki as Neri, the lead character. The show is set in the near future, and focuses on an unusual girl named Neri who lives alone on an island, and the friendships she develops with the inhabitants of an underwater research facility called ORCA (Oceanic Research Centre of Australia). It ran for four seasons, and was broadcast from 29 August 1994 to 22 December 1997.

Series overview

Episodes

Season 1 (1994)

Season 2 (1995)

Season 3 (1996–97)

Season 4 (1997)

References

External links 
 

1994 Australian television seasons
1995 Australian television seasons
1996 Australian television seasons
1997 Australian television seasons
Lists of Australian children's television series episodes
Lists of science fiction television series episodes
Lists of Australian drama television series episodes